Oleo saccharum ("oil sugar") is a sugar-oil mixture produced by coating citrus or other oil-rich fruit rinds in an excess of sugar. The essential oils extracted into the sugar give a concentrated aromatic mixture rich in terpenes that would otherwise not be possible through aqueous extraction processes due to the oils' hydrophobicity and volatility. In mixology, oleo saccharum can be used to sweeten beverages by their direct use or as an ingredient in flavored syrups. Oleo saccharum is a key component in many punch recipes, being listed as an ingredient as early as 1670. 

Oil extraction is greatly accelerated through muddling or mechanical abrasion of the mixture, which helps to rupture oil-rich vacuoles on the rinds' surface or flavedo. A frequent misconception is that oil extraction occurs due to sugar's hygroscopic nature, though this is unlikely as the essential oils being extracted are hydrophobic. This is also the reason why oil extraction via osmosis is also a frequent misconception, as the sugar cannot dissolve in the oil, there can be no sugar-solute based osmotic gradient.

References

Drink mixers
Citrus production